Küschall AG, headquartered in Witterswil, Switzerland, is a wheelchair manufacturing company.

History

1978–1995

The company was founded in 1978 by Rainer Küschall who was quadriplegic. Küschall's first successful model was the "Competition", which featured a new lightweight design. The first products were made at the beginning in the living room by the founder. Later the company moved into a property in Allschwil. In 1986 "Küschall of America" was opened followed two years later by "Küschall of Chile". Both companies, however, were disbanded only a few years later disbanded to be able to maintain the short distribution times.

1995 to today

Since 1995 the company has been a member of the Invacare group and has built its global presence. 2005 the company moved from Allschwil to Witterswil. The new site has been designed for greater production and an increasing number of people and has a modern infrastructure in the newly created Technology Center Witterswil.

Technology

Monotube design

The Küschall AG released in 1985 the first wheelchair with a minimum frame design on the market.

Low Impact System (L.I.S.)
In 2007 Küschall launched a shock absorbing module, "LIS" low impact system which was installed in the R33 wheelchair to increase comfort.

Vario axle
In the late nineties the Vario-axle was released on the market, a model which allowed the camber to be adjusted for the first time.

Awards
In 1985, Rainer Küschall was awarded for the "Competition" wheelchair with the prestigious Designer Award from the Museum of Modern Art in New York (where he is also on display). In 2003 the company won the JB Richey Innovation Award for the wheelchair model "Champion", followed by the Red Dot Design Award in 2004 for the model "Fusion". The Model R33 was awarded for its unique shock absorption system in 2007 with the Janus Award, the Coup de Coeur and 2008 with the Rehacare Best Design Award

References

External links 

Wheelchair manufacturers
Manufacturing companies of Switzerland
Companies based in the canton of Solothurn